Gajab Thai Gayo!  is a 2022 Indian Gujarati science fiction comedy children's film written and directed by Neeraj Joshi. The film stars Malhar Thakar, Pooja Jhaveri and Ujjwal Chopra in lead roles.

Plot  
Bhagirath, a post graduate from a reputed university, offers to teach students for free in their mother tongue at Sheth Kapurchand Mangaldas Vidyalaya, one of the last existing Gujarati medium schools. The principal is struggling to keep the school running. Vishwa, principal's daughter and a teacher, does not trust Bhagirath as his teaching methods are unconventional. Bhagirath, Vishwa and students travel to nearby village. They stumble upon a relic which takes them on an adventure of a lifetime beyond space and time.

Cast 
 Malhar Thakar as Bhagirath Jatashankar Narbheram/Bhajan
 Pooja Jhaveri as Vishwa
 Ujjwal Chopra as Raghuram
 Sunil Vishrani as Tom
 Vaibhav Biniwale as Mama 
 Kahan Mistry as Virat 
 Khush Tahilramani as Anant 
 Sneha Chauhan as Paheli 
 Shraddha Suthar as Jerry

Production 
The film stars Malhar Thakar, Pooja Jhaveri and Ujjwal Chopra in lead roles. This children's film incorporates science fiction, comedy, thriller and adventure elements. More than hundred school children were cast in the film.

Soundtrack

The Tips Industries acquired the music rights of the film. According to Soumitra Das of The Times of India, the music was well received by the audience.

Release 
The motion poster was released on 4 March 2022. The Tips Industries released the trailer on 21 March 2022. The film was released on 7 April 2022.

Reception 
Chintan Modi of News9 criticised the film incoherent script and direction. He also called acting "lacklustre" and the film "underwhelming". Siraj Syed writing for FilmFestivals rated it 2.5 out of 5. He praised the themes, VFX, acting and music but criticised plot, editing and length. Prakhar Pateriya of Vibes of India praised it as an experimental sci-fi film.

References

External links
 

2022 films
2020s Gujarati-language films
Films shot in Gujarat
Indian children's films
Indian science fiction films